Gopal Krishna Saxena (26 March 1951 – 19 April 2021) was an Indian politician and a member of the Thirteenth Legislative Assembly of Uttar Pradesh in India. He represented the Puranpur constituency of Uttar Pradesh and was a member of the Samajwadi Party political party.

Early life and education 
Gopal Krishna Saxena was born in Pilibhit district. He attended the Lucknow University and attained L.L.B. Degree.

Political career 
Gopal Krishna Saxena has been a MLA for one term. He represented the Puranpur constituency and is a member of the Samajwadi Party political party.

He lost his seat in the 2002 Uttar Pradesh Assembly Election to Vinod Tiwari of the Bharatiya Janata Party.

Posts held

See also 

 Puranpur (Assembly constituency)
 Thirteen Legislative Assembly of Uttar Pradesh
 Uttar Pradesh Legislative Assembly

References

Uttar Pradesh politicians
1951 births
2021 deaths
Samajwadi Party politicians from Uttar Pradesh
Deaths from the COVID-19 pandemic in India
People from Pilibhit district